Mudrika Sinha (born February 1914) is an Indian politician. He was elected to the lower House of the Indian Parliament the Lok Sabha from Aurangabad in Bihar as a member of the Indian National Congress.

References

External links
Official biographical sketch in Parliament of India website

1914 births
Possibly living people
Indian National Congress politicians
India MPs 1967–1970
Lok Sabha members from Bihar
Indian National Congress politicians from Bihar